Curtis Harvey Castle (October 4, 1848 – July 12, 1928) was a U.S. Representative from California.

Biography
Castle was born near Galesburg, Illinois on October 4, 1848, and attended the public schools and Knox College.  In 1872, he graduated from Northwestern University in Evanston, Illinois with a Bachelor of Arts degree, and Northwestern later awarded him a Master of Arts degree.

After graduating from college, Castle served as principal of the Washington, Texas public schools from 1872 to 1876.  In 1878, he graduated from the College of Physicians and Surgeons in Keokuk, Iowa.  After becoming a doctor, he practiced in Fulton County, Illinois and  Wayland, Iowa until 1882.

Castle moved to Point Arena, California in 1882, and to Merced County in 1888, where he continued the practice of medicine. After moving to California, he was a member of the American Academy of Medicine and several local and county medical societies.  Having previously been a Republican, in the 1890s he became active in politics as a Populist.  He served as chairman of the party in Merced County, and a member of its California state executive committee.

In 1896, Castle was elected to the Fifty-fifth Congress as a Populist with support from the Democrats, and served one term (March 4, 1897 – March 3, 1899).  He was an unsuccessful candidate for reelection in 1898, and resumed practicing of medicine in Merced.  In 1901, Castle moved to San Francisco, where he continued to practice medicine.  In 1903, Castle moved to Dinuba, where he practiced medicine in addition to owning and operating a peach orchard, vineyard, and land for growing grapes that were used in producing raisins.  Castle also had ownership stakes in companies that developed the Coalinga Oil Field.

Retirement and death
Castle retired to Santa Barbara, California, where he lived until his death on July 12, 1928. He was cremated and the ashes were deposited in the mausoleum of the Santa Barbara Cemetery and Crematory.

Family
Castle's first wife was Susan Alma Tabor, with whom he had two children, Grace Imogene Castle and Curtis Harvey Castle Jr.  After her death, Castle married Virginia Nixon Wills, with whom he had four children, Paul Long Castle, Chandos Barret Castle, Mercedes Castle, and Genevieve Wills Castle. Paul Long Castle died shortly after his birth on the first of February 1892.

References

Sources

Books

Newspapers

External links

1848 births
1928 deaths
California Populists
People from Galesburg, Illinois
People's Party members of the United States House of Representatives from California
Northwestern University alumni
People from Point Arena, California
Burials at Santa Barbara Cemetery
Members of the United States House of Representatives from California